The Scottish National League Division One (known as Tennent's National League Division 1 for sponsorship reasons) is the second tier of the Scottish League Championship for amateur rugby union clubs in Scotland.

The division was established in its current format in 2014, with the creation of three national leagues below the Premiership.

History

Promotion and Relegation
The winners are promoted to the Scottish Premiership, with the runners-up entering a play-off at a neutral venue against the 9th-placed team in the Premiership. The bottom two teams are relegated to Scottish National League Division Two.

Promoted from 2018 to 2019 Scottish National League Division Two
Biggar RFC (1st)
Highland RFC (2nd)

Relegated from 2018 to 2019 Scottish Premiership
None

2021–22 Clubs
Biggar RFC
Cartha Queens Park RFC
Dundee HSFP
Gala RFC
Highland RFC
Kelso RFC

The Super 6 clubs were also allowed to run 2XV sides in this league for the 2019–20 season (not shown on map).

The clubs remained the same as the 2019–20 season due to the COVID-19 pandemic.

Past winners
Winners of the second-tier competition – includes Division Two (1973–1995), Premiership Division Two (1996-2012), National League (2013–2014) and National League Division One (2015–)

Kelso (as Division Two)
Langholm
Selkirk
Melrose
Kelso
Melrose
Gordonians RFC
Selkirk
Kilmarnock RFC
Ayr
Glasgow Academicals
Kilmarnock RFC
Glasgow Academicals
Kilmarnock RFC
Jed-Forest
Stirling County

Watsonians
Kelso
West Of Scotland
Glasgow High Kelvinside
Kelso
Currie (as Premiership Division Two)

Glasgow Hawks
Gala
Boroughmuir
Stirling County
Peebles
Watsonians
Gala
Stirling County
Dundee HSFP
Stirling County
West Of Scotland
Dundee HSFP
Stirling County
Edinburgh Academicals (split format)
Jed-Forest
Glasgow Hawks (as National League)
Boroughmuir
Selkirk (as National League Division 1)
Watsonians
Marr
Edinburgh Academicals
Marr
 Biggar

3